Kettering College (formerly Kettering College of Medical Arts) is a private Adventist college in Dayton, Ohio. The college is owned by the Kettering Medical Center and chartered by the Seventh-day Adventist Church. The college was built in 1967 next to the Charles F. Kettering Memorial Hospital.

Presidents
Charles Scriven, 2001-2013
Alex Bryan, 2013-2014
Nate Brandstater 2014-

Academics
Kettering College offers a doctorate in occupational therapy, Master's degree in Physician Assistant Studies as well as several Bachelor of Science and Associate of Science programs in several health fields.

See also

 List of Seventh-day Adventist colleges and universities
 Seventh-day Adventist education

References

External links
 

Education in Montgomery County, Ohio
Universities and colleges affiliated with the Seventh-day Adventist Church
Seventh-day Adventist universities and colleges in the United States
Private universities and colleges in Ohio
Educational institutions established in 1967
Healthcare in Dayton, Ohio
Kettering, Ohio
Buildings and structures in Montgomery County, Ohio
1967 establishments in Ohio